Michael or Mike Hastings may refer to:
Michael Hastings (playwright) (1938–2011), British playwright, screenwriter, novelist, and poet
Michael Abney-Hastings, 14th Earl of Loudoun (1942–2012), English-born Australian rice farmer, Scottish aristocrat, and pretender to the ancient Crown of England 
Michael Hastings, Baron Hastings of Scarisbrick (born 1958), British peer and television executive
Mike Hastings (ice hockey) (born 1966), American coach
Michael Hastings (journalist) (1980–2013), American
Michael Hastings (politician) (born 1980), member of Illinois State Senate
Michael Harvey Hastings, British neuroscientist

See also 
 Hastings (name)